Namoli Brennet is a singer-songwriter and trans woman who has been touring the United States since the release of her first album in 2002.

Brennet produces, engineers and releases her albums on her own record label, Flaming Dame Records. Her music has been featured on NPR, PBS, and the Emmy-award winning documentary, Out in the Silence, which details the struggle of a gay teen growing up in rural Pennsylvania. Brennet has received four nominations for OUTmusic awards and was the recipient of a Tucson Folk Festival Songwriting Award. Brennet has shared stages with Melissa Ferrick, Jill Sobule, Alix Olson, and Girlyman.

Brennet was a Connecticut native before moving to Tucson, Arizona, where she lived for ten years. Since 2013, she has lived in Decorah, Iowa. Brennet toured Europe in June 2014, following the release of her latest album Ditch Lilies. In 2014, she began performing in Germany with the Namoli Brennet Trio which consists of herself as vocalist and guitarist, bassist Amy Zapf, and drummer Micha Maass. They first performed at The Blue Wave Festival in 2014 and toured in the spring of 2015.

Discography
Boy in a Dress (2002) Girls Gotta Eat Records
Welcome to the Afterglow (2003) Girls Gotta Eat Records
The Brighter Side Of Me (2004) Girls Gotta Eat Records
Chrysanthemum (2005) Girls Gotta Eat Records
Alive (2006) Girls Gotta Eat Records
Singer Shine Your Light (2007) Flaming Dame Records
Until From This Dream I Wake (2009) Flaming Dame Records
 Black Crow (2010) Flaming Dame Records
 We Were Born to Rise (2011) Flaming Dame Records
 Namoli Brennet LIVE (2012) Flaming Dame Records
 Ditch Lilies (2015) Flaming Dame Records
 The Simple Life (2018) Flaming Dame Records
 LigHt iT uP (2020) Flaming Dame Records

References

External links
 NamoliBrennet.com
Namoli Brennet on MySpace

American folk musicians
American harmonica players
American rock musicians
Living people
LGBT people from Connecticut
LGBT people from Arizona
American LGBT singers
American LGBT songwriters
Transgender singers
Transgender songwriters
1970 births
American transgender writers